Josselin Ouanna is the defending champion, but lost to Matteo Viola in the Quarterfinals.
Marc Gicquel defeated Matteo Viola 6–4, 6–3 in the final.

Seeds

Draw

Finals

Top half

Bottom half

References
 Main Draw
 Qualifying Draw

Trophee des Alpilles - Singles
2013 Singles